Air Marshal Sir John Matthias Dobson Sutton,  (9 July 1932 – 21 November 2014) was a Royal Air Force officer who served as Air Officer Commanding-in-Chief at RAF Support Command from 1986 to 1989 and Lieutenant Governor of Jersey from 1990 to 1995.

RAF career
Educated at Queen Elizabeth's Grammar School, Alford, Sutton joined the Royal Air Force in 1950. He was appointed Officer Commanding No. 249 Squadron in 1964 and then became Assistant Secretary of the Chiefs of Staff Committee at the Ministry of Defence in 1966. He went on to be Officer Commanding No. 14 Squadron in 1970, Assistant Chief of Staff (Plans & Policy) at Headquarters Second Tactical Air Force in 1971 and Assistant Chief of the Air Staff (Policy) in 1977. He then became Deputy Commander of RAF Germany in 1980, Assistant Chief of the Defence Staff (Commitments) in 1982 and Assistant Chief of the Defence Staff (Overseas) in 1985. He became Air Officer Commanding-in-Chief at RAF Support Command in 1986 and retired in 1989.

Governorship and later life
In retirement, Sutton was made Lieutenant Governor of Jersey. He attended a reunion of Lieutenant Governors in 2008. He died on 21 November 2014.

Family
In 1954 Sutton married Delia Eleanor Woodward; they had one son and one daughter. Following the dissolution of his first marriage he married Angela Faith Gray in 1969 and they had two sons. Sutton's elder son by his second marriage, Mark, became famous after parachuting into the 2012 Olympics opening ceremony, pretending to be James Bond escorting the Queen. Mark died in an accident just over a year later in August 2013, when his wingsuit clipped a ridge in Valais, Switzerland.

References

|-

1932 births
2014 deaths
British military personnel of the Indonesia–Malaysia confrontation
Governors of Jersey
Knights Commander of the Order of the Bath
People educated at Queen Elizabeth's Grammar School, Alford
Recipients of the Commendation for Valuable Service in the Air
Royal Air Force air marshals